Game Tested, Streets Approved is the third and final studio album by Black Rob, released on July 26, 2011 through Duck Down Music Inc. The album managed to peak at number 44 on the Billboard Top R&B/Hip-Hop Albums.

Background
The album was his first since The Black Rob Report, which was released six year earlier in 2005. Shortly after the release of that album, Black Rob was sentenced to seven years in prison for grand larceny and served four years of that sentence before being released in 2010. After his release from prison, Rob cut ties with his previous label Bad Boy Records and signed a deal with independent rap label, Duck Down Music Inc. and began work on Game Tested, Streets Approved.

Track listing
 "Welcome Back" – 3:04
 "Boiling Water" – 4:02
 "Bumpin'" – 2:40
 "Can't Make it in NY" – 2:57
 "Showin Up" – 3:52
 "Celebration" – 3:41
 "Wanna Get Dough" – 4:07
 "Get Involved" – 4:11
 "Sand to the Beach" – 4:04
 "Made Me a Man" – 4:14
 "Fuck Em'" – 2:47
 "This is What it Is" – 3:16
 "Up North - This is What it Is" – 3:54
 "No Fear" (featuring Sean Price) – 3:16

Charts

Personnel

 Anthony "Buckwild" Best – Producer
 Bishop – Mixing, Producer
 Black Rob – Executive Producer, Producer
 Jemal Mosley - Executive Producer
 Buckshot – Associate Executive Producer
 Matt Castillo – Assistant Engineer
 Coptic – Mixing
 D'Mile – Producer
 DJ Pain – Producer
 Dru Ha – Associate Executive Producer
 Noah Friedman – Project Coordinator
 G Koop – Bass, Guitar, Keyboards, Percussion
 Joseph "Bishop" Gallo – Engineer

 Nicholas "Young McFly" Greer – Producer
 M. Gremillion – Composer
 Rob Mandell – Composer
 Eric Matlock – A&R, Producer
 Jemal Mosley – Executive Producer
 S. Price – Composer
 Self Service – Mixing, Producer
 David Shapiro – Composer, Producer
 Spank – Producer
 Gerald "Soul G" Stevens – Composer, Producer
 Jermaine Washington – Composer, Producer

References

2011 albums
Black Rob albums
Duck Down Music albums